Anna Marie Caballero (born April 18, 1955) is an American politician serving in the California State Senate. A Democrat, she represents the 12th State Senate district, encompassing the Salinas Valley and part of the Central Valley. She previously served in the California State Assembly representing the 30th Assembly District, encompassing the Pajaro and Salinas Valleys in the Central Coast, from 2016 to 2018 and the 28th Assembly District from 2006 to 2010.

Early life and education 
Born in Arizona to a family of copper miners, Caballero moved to the Salinas Valley to work for California Rural Legal Assistance. She received her B.A. degree from the University of California, San Diego and her J.D. degree from the UCLA School of Law.

Career 
As an attorney, Caballero represented striking farm workers and fought side by side with unions to prevent plant closures. She, along with three partners, founded the law firm Caballero, Matcham & McCarthy, in 1982 to provide low cost legal service. Caballero was recognized with the Athena Award for entrepreneurial excellence.

Caballero served on the Planning Commission and was later elected to the Salinas City Council in 1991. She was then elected Mayor in 1998. As Mayor, she navigated Salinas through budgetary problems and managed to keep Salinas's libraries open through a donations program. Caballero was elected to the State Assembly in 2006.

Caballero ran for the California State Senate in 2010 to replace term-limited Republican incumbent Jeff Denham, who ran successfully for Congress. She lost to Republican Ceres Mayor Anthony Cannella in an upset.

California Governor Jerry Brown appointed Caballero to lead the California State and Consumer Services Agency on March 22, 2011, serving until 2015. In 2016, she was again elected as a Democrat to the California State Assembly.

In 2018, Caballero announced that she would again run for the state Senate to succeed Cannella, who was term limited.
She won the seat, defeating Republican Madera County Supervisor Rob Poythress.

Caballero has also served as the executive director of Partners for Peace, a nonprofit organization dedicated to bringing the community together to prevent gang violence and focus on literacy, early childhood education, and providing services to families. Caballero is also a wife and mother. Her husband, Juan Uranga, is the Director of the Center for Community Advocacy in Salinas.

2016 California State Assembly

References

External links

 
 Campaign website
 California Rural Legal Assistance
 Join California Anna Caballero

1955 births
21st-century American politicians
21st-century American women politicians
American women lawyers
California lawyers
Hispanic and Latino American state legislators in California
Hispanic and Latino American women in politics
Living people
Mayors of places in California
Democratic Party members of the California State Assembly
People from Salinas, California
UCLA School of Law alumni
University of California, San Diego alumni
Women mayors of places in California
Women state legislators in California